Masala is a Singapore-Tamil soap opera, starring J. Aravind Naidu, Narain, Kokila, Puravalan Narayanasamy, Ashwini, Shreedhee Sajeev, Jitenram Kiran Bala, Chef Arifin, R. Sommasundram and among others. It aired every Monday through Thursday at 10:30 PM SST on MediaCorp Vasantham from 31 October 2016 to 13 January 2017 for 43 episodes. The show's final one-hour episode aired Friday 13 January 2017 at 9:30 PM SST. It was produced by Millenia Motion Pictures and directed by N. Mohd Yahssir.

Plot
Masala revolves around a family-run restaurant started by Ravindran. Problems arise when the restaurant is handed over to Ravindran's daughter-in-law, Nandhini. How will the family resolve their issues and restore Masala Kitchen's previous success?

Cast
 J. Aravind Naidu
 Narain
 Kokila
 Puravalan Narayanasamy
 Ashwini
 Shreedhee Sajeev
 Jitenram Kiran Bala
 Chef Arifin
 R. Sommasundram
 Elias Mikail
 Sithira
 Balakumaran
 Khomala Lea
 Shylu
 Winston
 Jay Devaraj Thevan
 Jothilatchmi

Broadcast
Series was released on 31 October 2016 on Mediacorp Vasantham. It aired in [Singapore] on Mediacorp Vasantham, its full-length episodes and released its episodes on their app Toggle, a live TV feature was introduced on Toggle with English subtitles.

References

External links 
 Vasantham Official Website

Tamil-language cooking television series
Tamil-language romance television series
Singapore Tamil dramas
2016 Tamil-language television series debuts
Vasantham TV original programming
Tamil-language television shows in Singapore
2017 Tamil-language television series endings